The lats (plural: lati or latu (if the number can be divided by 10), ISO 4217 currency code: LVL or 428) was the currency of Latvia from 1922 until 1940 and from 1993 until it was replaced by the euro on 1 January 2014.  A two-week transition period during which the lats was in circulation alongside the euro ended on 14 January 2014. The lats is abbreviated as Ls and was subdivided into 100 santīmi (singular: santīms; from French centime), abbreviated as an s after the santīm amount.

The Latvian lats has been recognized as one of the 99 entries of the Latvian Culture Canon.

First lats, 1922–1940

The first lats (symbol: 𝓛𝓈) was first introduced on 3 August 1922, replacing the Latvian ruble at a rate of 𝓛𝓈 1 = Rbls 50. The lats was pegged against the gold standard from its introduction until 1940.

On 17 June 1940, Latvia was occupied by the USSR. After the dismantling of the Bank of Latvia and its replacement with the Latvia Republican Office of the Gosbank on 10 October, the Soviet ruble was introduced alongside the lats on 25 November 1940 at par, although the real monetary value of the ruble was about a third of the lats. Thus both wages and prices were gradually raised to devalue the lats from June to November 1940. To lessen the effect of the exodus of goods sent by Soviet occupational personnel to the USSR, taking advantage of the new exchange rate, buyer limits for various goods were introduced.

Although the Soviet authorities initially pledged not to abolish the lats, it was taken out of circulation without prior warning at 13:05 on 25 March 1941, simultaneously nationalising all deposits larger than 𝓛𝓈 1000. A part of the Latvian gold, silver and currency reserves were sent to Moscow at the start of the occupation.

Coins
Coins were issued in denominations of 1, 2, 5, 10, 20 and 50 santīmu, 𝓛𝓈 1, 𝓛𝓈 2 and 𝓛𝓈 5. The 1s, 2s and 5s were in bronze (Cu, Sn, Zn), the 10s, 20s and 50s were nickel, while coins of 𝓛𝓈 1 and above were struck in silver, with a purity of 83,5 percent.

Banknotes
The Latvian Bank issued notes from 1922 in denominations of 𝓛𝓈 20, 𝓛𝓈 25, 𝓛𝓈 50, 𝓛𝓈 100 and 𝓛𝓈 500. They also issued 𝓛𝓈 10 notes which were 500 ruble notes overprinted with the new denomination. The government issued currency notes from 1925 in denominations of 𝓛𝓈 5, 𝓛𝓈 10 and 𝓛𝓈 20.

Second lats, 1993–2013
The lats was reintroduced on 5 March 1993, replacing the Latvian ruble, which continued to circulate and kept validity until and including 30 June 1994 at a rate of LR 200 being equivalent to Ls 1. The Ls 5 banknote was introduced first, and the last banknote to be introduced was the Ls 500 banknote on 20 July 1998. The lats was replaced on 1 January 2014 by the Euro, at the rate of Ls 0.702804 to €1. The second lats can be exchanged to euros at the official rate at the Bank of Latvia's cashier's office in Riga.

Until the end of its circulation in January 2014, lats was the fourth highest-valued currency unit per face value, after the Kuwaiti dinar, Bahraini dinar, and the Omani rial. The Ls 500 note was the world's third most valuable banknote after the $10,000 Brunei/Singaporean dollar note and the 1,000 Swiss franc note. With abolition of Maltese lira on 1 January 2008, lats became the most valued European currency.

Coins
Coins were issued in denominations of 1s, 2s, 5s, 10s, 20s and 50s, Ls 1 and Ls 2. Besides standard coins in the list below and coins for collectors, the following coins were also issued: three commemorative circulation coins were issued in denominations of Ls 2, Ls 10 and Ls 100 (the latter two of which were, respectively, silver and gold), a Ls 100 gold bullion coin, and a series of limited design Ls1 coins twice a year from 2004 to 2013, and once in 2001 and 2003.

The initial standard Ls 2 coin was issued only once in 1992, it was a copper-nickel coin of 6g and measured 24.35mm in diameter. It was gradually replaced in circulation from 1999 with the below bimetallic coin due to counterfeiting issues.

The standard coins were designed by Gunārs Lūsis and Jānis Strupulis.

Banknotes
All banknotes are 130 × 65 mm in size. They were printed by Giesecke & Devrient GmbH in Germany and were designed by Imants Žodžiks and Valdis Ošiņš.

See also

 Bank of Latvia
 Latvian euro coins
 Commemorative coins of Latvia
 Economy of Latvia

References

External links 
 Central bank of Latvia
 
 The pre-euro banknotes of Latvia 
 Video: The story of Latvia's "lats" currency. 11 March 2020. Public Broadcasting of Latvia.

1922 establishments in Latvia
1993 establishments in Latvia
2014 disestablishments in Latvia
Currencies of Latvia
Economy of Latvia
Fixed exchange rate
Currencies replaced by the euro
Modern obsolete currencies